
"On the Reeperbahn at Half Past Midnight" (German:"") is a 1912 German song by Ralph Arthur Roberts, originally written for a musical revue. The song refers to the Reeperbahn, the red light district of the port city of Hamburg. The song's popularity received a major boost when it was used in the 1944 film Große Freiheit Nr. 7, sung by the star Hans Albers.

Overview
Three films have taken their title from the song, including On the Reeperbahn at Half Past Midnight (1954), a film starring Albers which attempted to repeat the success of his earlier hit. The tune was used for Billy Wilder's Witness for the Prosecution (1957), sung by Marlene Dietrich with new English lyrics as "I May Never Go Home Anymore".

The song is popular with fans of the Hamburg football club St. Pauli. The song has been parodied numerous times including Mike Krüger's On the Autobahn at Half Past Midnight (Auf der Autobahn nachts um halb eins).

See also 
 List of songs about Hamburg

References

Bibliography
 Hake, Sabine. Popular Cinema of the Third Reich. University of Texas Press, 2001.
 Phillips, Gene D. Some Like It Wilder: The Life and Controversial Films of Billy Wilder. University Press of Kentucky,  2010 

German songs
1912 songs
Songs from musicals
Culture in Hamburg
Songs about cities
Songs about Germany
Songs about streets
Songs about prostitutes